This is a list of songs written or co-written by Lynsey de Paul.

"A Lover Lovin' You"
"All I Am"
"All Night"
"A Little TLC"
"Beautiful"
"Before You Go Tonight"
"Billy"
"Blind Leading The Blind"
"Boomerang"
"Brandy"
"Bring Yourself Back To Me"
"Call Me"
"Central Park Arrest"
"Certified"
"Crossword Puzzle"
"Dancin' (on a Saturday Night)"
"Dedicated"
"Do Unto Others"
"Doctor Doctor"
"Don't You Remember When"
"E.O.I.O."
"Forever And A Day"
"Get Your Gun"
"Getting a Drag"
"Going to a Disco"
"Happy Christmas To You From Me"
"He Can't Dance" 
"Hearts of Gold" 
"Hi Summer"
"Hollywood Romance"
"Hot Shot"
"House of Cards"
"Hug and Squeeze Me"
"I Gotcha Now"
"If I Don't Get You The Next One Will"
"If Only"
"Instant Love"
"Into My Music"
"It's Been a Long Time"
"Ivory Tower"
"Keep Your Mouth Shut"
"Just a Little Time"
"Just Visiting"
"Le Temps De Vivre"
"Lend us a Fiver"
"Let Your Body Go Downtown"
"Live for Love" ("Et bonjour à toi l'artiste")
"Losin' the Blues for You"
"Love Bomb"
"Mama Do"
"Martian Man"
"Melancholy Melon"
"Miss Hit and Run"
"Mona"
"My Man and Me"
"New York Minute"
"No, Honestly"
"Nothing Really Lasts Forever"
"Now and Then"
"Nursery Rhyme"
"On the Ride (You Do It Once, You Do It Twice)"
"Ooh I Do"
"Papa Do"
"Pilger Theme" 
"Rock Bottom"
"Rockerdile"
"Roter Mann"
"Sad Old Shadow"
"School Love"
"Side By Side"
"So Good To You"
"Stick to You"
"Storm in a Teacup"
"Strange Changes"
"Sugar Me"
"Sugar Shuffle"
"Suspicion"
"Take Back Your Heartaches"
"Take Your Time"
"Takin' It Easy"
"Taking It On"
"The One Exception"
"The Rag Trade"
"The Thieves of Paris"
"The Way It Goes"
"There's No Place Like London"
"They'd Rather Be Making Money"
"Thunder in the Night"
"Til You Come Back Hone"
"Time and Place"
"Tip of My Tongue"
"Tigers and Fireflies"
"Twas"
"Water"
"We Got Love"
"What You Gonna Do With Your Freedom"
"Without You"
"When You've Gotta Go"
"Won't Somebody Dance with Me"
"Words Don't Mean a Thing"
"You Give Me Those Feelings"
"You Don't Know"
"You Made Me Write This Song"
"You Shouldn't Say That"
"You've Either Got It Or You Ain't"

References

de Paul